Joseph or Joe White may refer to:

Academics
 Joseph White (orientalist) (1745–1814), Regius Professor of Hebrew at Oxford University, 1802
 Joseph White (psychologist) (1932–2017), professor of psychology and psychiatry at the University of California, Irvine
 Joe E. White (1937–2018), retired president of Carl Albert State College
 B. Joseph White (born 1947), president of University of Illinois, 2005–2009

Arts and entertainment
 Joseph White (tenor) (1891–1959), Irish-American tenor
 Joseph B. White, journalist
 Joseph Blanco White (1775–1841), British poet and theologian
 Joseph Gleeson White (1851–1898), English writer on art
 José White Lafitte  (1836-1913), Cuban-French violinist and composer

Military
 Joseph White (Medal of Honor) (1840–?), American Civil War sailor
 Joseph Leonard Maries White (1897–1925), Canadian World War I pilot
 Joseph T. White (1961–1985), U.S. army private who apparently defected to North Korea

Politics and government
 Joseph M. White (1781–1839), U.S. Delegate from Florida Territory
 Joseph L. White (died 1861), U.S. Representative from Indiana
 Joseph W. White (1822–1892), U.S. Representative from Ohio
 Joseph C. White (1899–1967), American politician in Massachusetts
 Joe Slade White (born 1950), Democratic political strategist and media consultant

Sports
 Joseph White (cricketer) (fl. 1806), English cricketer
 Joseph White (squash player) (born 1997), Australian squash player
 Joe White (footballer, born 1999), English footballer
 Joe White (defender, born 2002), English footballer
 Joe White (midfielder, born 2002), English footballer
 Joe White (boxer), Welsh boxer
 Jo Jo White (Joseph Henry White, 1946–2018), basketball player
 Joe White (ice hockey) (born 1988), English ice hockey goaltender
 Joseph White (wrestler)

Other people
 Joe White, a character from Hawaii Five-0
 Captain Joseph White, 1830 murder victim, whose death prompted a trial prosecuted by Daniel Webster
 Joseph White, first president of the South African Radio Relay League
 Joseph White (died 2011), one of the "Beatrice Six"
 Julius W. "Mr. Joe" White Sr., shoeshine man in Myrtle Beach, South Carolina, United States for whom Mr. Joe White Avenue is named

See also
 Joe Whyte (born 1961), American actor
 Jo White (cricketer) (born 1979), Canadian cricketer
 José White Lafitte aka Joseph White (1836–1918), Cuban composer and violinist